Beauty Stab is the second studio album by English pop band ABC, released on 14 November 1983 by Neutron Records, Mercury Records and Vertigo Records. The album was recorded over a period of three months between August and September 1983, in sessions that took place at Sarm Studios East and West, Townhouse Studios and Abbey Road Studios. It was a departure from the stylised production of the band's debut studio album, The Lexicon of Love (1982), and featured a more guitar-oriented sound.

The album was produced by ABC with Gary Langan, who had been the audio engineer on the band's debut studio album. The band employed the rhythm section of Andy Newmark (drums) and Alan Spenner (bass guitar) both of whom had recently recorded and toured with Roxy Music at the time. The cover photography was by Gered Mankowitz.

On release, the album was received negatively by the majority of music critics. In a 1995 article, music journalist Simon Reynolds listed Beauty Stab among "the great career-sabotage LPs in pop history". In retrospect, the band members themselves have been quite vocal in that they were less satisfied with the album with founding member Stephen Singleton leaving the band soon after promotion for the album was completed. Martin Fry later stated that "we were eager to go in a totally different direction [to The Lexicon of Love]. We didn't want to do a sequel. In retrospect, perhaps that is exactly what we should have done". The album was certified Gold by the BPI for shipments in excess of 100,000 copies, but was not as commercially successful as its predecessor. It peaked at No. 12 on the UK Albums Chart and spawned only two Top 40 singles (neither of which made the Top 10).

In 2005, a digitally remastered CD of the album was released with three bonus tracks.

Music and legacy
According to Bob Stanley of The Guardian, Beauty Stab was a drastic departure from The Lexicon of Love, and was "their attempt to take on the preconceptions of their fanbase": "The strings were gone, replaced by some tough guitars that sounded weirdly dated – sometimes like Low-era Bowie, sometimes closer to Led Zeppelin. Had it been released two years later, when guitars were voguish once more, it would have kept the ABC boat afloat. Instead, it just sounded confusing." The song "That Was Then but This Is Now" has appeared in several worst lyrics polls including one held in 2007 by BBC Radio 6 Music.

In a list of follow-up albums featuring a change in style, Alfred Soto of Stylus Magazine said that "the band abandoned the marimbas and Mantovani" of their previous album "for rawk power chords and declamatory singing." Although noting that "most of its songs are as politically informed as a can of hair spray", he felt that "Beauty Stab is touching, the sound of young men with too much money and too facile a talent for one-liners getting back at the philistines who dismissed them as nancy boys."

Track listing

Personnel
ABC
 Martin Fry – lead and backing vocals
 Mark White – pianos; Roland Juno-6; E-mu Emulator; synthesizers; guitars 
 Stephen Singleton – alto saxophone

Additional personnel
 Alan Spenner – bass guitar
 Andy Newmark – drums
 Luís Jardim (misspelled as "Louis Jardin" on album notes) – percussion
 Howie Casey –  baritone saxophone; tenor saxophone
 David Theodore – oboe
 ABC and David Bedford – string arrangements

Production
 ABC – producers; arrangements; album sleeve design 
 Gary Langan – producer; engineer
 John Kurlander – assistant engineer at Abbey Road Studios
 Bob Kraushaar – assistant engineer at Sarm Studios East and West
 Keith Nixon – assistant engineer at Townhouse Studios
 Gered Mankowitz – photography
 Keith Breeden – album sleeve design assistant 
 Bill Gerber and Lookout Management – management

Charts

References

External links
 

1983 albums
ABC (band) albums
Mercury Records albums
Vertigo Records albums